Javy is a shortened nickname for the masculine given name Javier. Notable persons referred to as Javy include:

Javy Ayala (born 1988), American martial artist
Javy Báez, nickname for Javier Báez (born 1992), Puerto Rican baseball infielder
Javy López (born 1970), Puerto Rican baseball catcher
Javy Guerra (born 1985), American baseball pitcher
Javy Guerra (shortstop) (born 1995), Panamanian baseball shortstop
Javy Vázquez, nickname for Javier Vázquez (born 1976), Puerto Rican baseball pitcher

See also

JV (disambiguation)

Masculine given names